Morning Star Home Science College, is a women's degree college in Angamaly, Kerala. Established in 1963, it is affiliated with Mahatma Gandhi University, and offers courses in the arts, commerce and science.

Departments

Home Science
Physics
Chemistry
Zoology
English
Economics
Physical Education
Commerce

Accreditation
The college is  recognized by the University Grants Commission (UGC).

References

External links
http://morningstar.edu.in

Universities and colleges in Kochi
Educational institutions established in 1963
1963 establishments in Kerala
Arts and Science colleges in Kerala
Colleges affiliated to Mahatma Gandhi University, Kerala
Buildings and structures in Angamaly